The 1983 San Francisco Giants season was the Giants' 101st season in Major League Baseball, their 26th season in San Francisco since their move from New York following the 1957 season, and their 24th at Candlestick Park. The team finished in fifth place in the National League West with a 79–83 record, 12 games behind the Los Angeles Dodgers.

Offseason 
 October 15, 1982: Bill Bordley was released by the Giants.
 October 15, 1982: Alan Hargesheimer was traded by the Giants to the Chicago Cubs for Herman Segelke.
 December 14, 1982: Joe Morgan and Al Holland were traded by the Giants to the Philadelphia Phillies for Mike Krukow, Mark Davis, and Charles Penigar (minors).
 February 7, 1983: Joel Youngblood was signed as a free agent by the Giants.

Regular season

Season standings

Record vs. opponents

Opening Day starters 
 Bob Brenly
 Jack Clark
 Chili Davis
 Darrell Evans
 Mike Krukow
 Duane Kuiper
 Johnnie LeMaster
 Jeffrey Leonard
 Tom O'Malley

Notable transactions 
 May 1, 1983: Brian Kingman was signed as a free agent by the Giants.
 June 6, 1983: 1983 Major League Baseball draft
 Charlie Hayes was drafted by the Giants in the 4th round.
 Mike Aldrete was drafted by the Giants in the 7th round. Player signed June 22, 1983.

Roster

Player stats

Batting

Starters by position 
Note: Pos = Position; G = Games played; AB = At bats; H = Hits; Avg. = Batting average; HR = Home runs; RBI = Runs batted in

Other batters 
Note: G = Games played; AB = At bats; H = Hits; Avg. = Batting average; HR = Home runs; RBI = Runs batted in

Pitching

Starting pitchers 
Note: G = Games pitched; IP = Innings pitched; W = Wins; L = Losses; ERA = Earned run average; SO = Strikeouts

Other pitchers 
Note: G = Games pitched; IP = Innings pitched; W = Wins; L = Losses; ERA = Earned run average; SO = Strikeouts

Relief pitchers 
Note: G = Games pitched; W = Wins; L = Losses; SV = Saves; ERA = Earned run average; SO = Strikeouts

Awards and honors 
 1983 Darrell Evans 1B, Willie Mac Award
All-Star Game

Farm system

References

External links
 1983 San Francisco Giants at Baseball Reference
 1983 San Francisco Giants at Baseball Almanac

San Francisco Giants seasons
San Francisco Giants season
1983 in San Francisco
San